Hemoglobin A2 (HbA2) is a normal variant of hemoglobin A that consists of two alpha and two delta chains (α2δ2) and is found at low levels in normal human blood.  Hemoglobin A2 may be increased in beta thalassemia or in people who are heterozygous for the beta thalassemia gene.

HbA2 exists in small amounts in all adult humans (1.5–3.1% of all hemoglobin molecules) and is approximately normal in people with sickle-cell disease. Its biological importance is not yet known.

References

External links
 
 Hemoglobin A2 - The clinical significance

Hemoglobins